is a stratovolcano complex in the Ōu Mountains of western Iwate Prefecture, in the Tōhoku region of northern Honshū,  Japan. It is included as one of the 100 famous mountains in Japan, a book composed in 1964 by mountaineer and author Kyūya Fukada. The mountain is on the borders of the municipalities  of Hachimantai, Takizawa, and Shizukuishi, west of the prefectural capital of Morioka. Much of the mountain is within the borders of the Towada-Hachimantai National Park. The mountain is also referred to as the "Nanbu Fuji" for its resemblance to Mount Fuji.

Geology

Mount Iwate consists of a younger eastern symmetrical stratovolcano (Higashi-Iwate, "East Iwate") overlapping an older western stratovolcano (Nishi-Iwate, "West Iwate") which has collapsed to form a caldera.  Nishi-Iwate was formed approximately 700,000 years ago, and forms two-thirds of the mountain body. Higashi-Iwate was a later (300,000 years ago) parasitic volcano, which now forms the summit of the mountain.  The oval-shaped, 1.8 x 3 km caldera of Nishi-Iwate has a 0.5 km wide crater, partially filled by a crater lake called Lake Onawashiro. Several somma including Yakushidake, the largest, surround the more recent Higashi Iwate crater rim.

During the historical period, Mount Iwate erupted in 1686-1687 with a pyroclastic surge; however, the eruption of 1732 was much larger and resulted in a substantial lava flow on the northeast slopes of the mountain. This four-kilometre long lava flow ("Yakebashiri Lava Flow") has been designated a Natural Monument by the Japanese government. Mount Iwate has largely been quiet since 1732, with a small emission of steam and ash in 1919 and a series of volcanic earthquakes from 1998 to 2003.

See also
 List of Ultras of Japan
 List of volcanoes in Japan
 List of mountains in Japan

References

External links

  - Japan Meteorological Agency
 Iwate Volcano - Geological Survey of Japan
 Iwatesan - Smithsonian Institution: Global Volcanism Program
- Hiking in Japan, Mount Iwate
Iwate Prefectural Tourism site
Hachimantai city tourism site

Volcanoes of Honshū
Stratovolcanoes of Japan
Mountains of Iwate Prefecture
Volcanoes of Iwate Prefecture
Hachimantai, Iwate
Takizawa, Iwate
Shizukuishi, Iwate
Highest points of Japanese national parks
Pleistocene stratovolcanoes
Holocene stratovolcanoes